1,4-Dibromobenzene (p-dibromobenzene) is an organic compound that is solid at room temperature.  This compound has two bromine atoms (bromo substituents) off the central benzene ring. It has a strong smell similar to that of the lighter chlorine analogue. It can be used as a precursor to the dye 6,6-Dibromoindigo.

Related compounds
 1,2-Dibromobenzene
 1,3-Dibromobenzene

References 

Bromoarenes